Vinay is a commune in the Isère department in southeastern France.

Vinay is a largely agricultural village. It is commonly known as the walnut capital of Grenoble and boasts over 175,000 trees.

Population

Twin towns
Vinay is twinned with:

  San Possidonio, Italy, since 2013

See also
Communes of the Isère department
Parc naturel régional du Vercors

References

Communes of Isère
Isère communes articles needing translation from French Wikipedia